The Select Stakes is a greyhound competition held at Nottingham Greyhound Stadium. 
It was run at Wembley Stadium from 1952 until 1996. When the Wembley Greyhounds ended, it moved to Nottingham in 1997. This was after the closure of the greyhounds at Wembley.

In 2022, new sponsors JenningsBet increased the winner's prize to £10,000.

Past winners

Locations
1954–1974 (Wembley, 525 yards)
1975–1996 (Wembley, 490 metres)
1997–present (Nottingham, 500 metres)

Sponsors
1983–1989 (Courage)
1994–1994 (Fosters)
2002–2002 (Victor Chandler)
2003–2004 (Ladbrokes)
2005–2017 (Betfred)
2018–2019 (Racing Post Greyhound TV)
2021–2021 (Arena Racing Company)
2022–present (JenningsBet)

References

Greyhound racing competitions in the United Kingdom
Sport in Nottingham
Events at Wembley Stadium
Sport in the London Borough of Brent
Greyhound racing in London